Green Bay is an unincorporated community in Hanover County, Virginia, United States.

References

Unincorporated communities in Hanover County, Virginia
Unincorporated communities in Virginia